The Kappen Cliffs are steep rock cliffs that form the south edge of Kar Plateau on Scott Coast, Victoria Land, Antarctica. They were named by the New Zealand Geographic Board (1999) after Professor Ludger Kappen of Kiel University, Germany, who conducted extensive lichen ecophysiology in the Cape Geology area.

References

Cliffs of Victoria Land
Scott Coast